The Unplugged Collection, Volume One is a compilation of performances taken from MTV Unplugged featuring sixteen artists – including R.E.M., k.d. lang, Stevie Ray Vaughan, and Soul Asylum.

The songs were culled from the artists' appearances on the show in the 1990s. Individual songs also appeared on the artists' own albums, such as Eric Clapton's Unplugged, Rod Stewart's Unplugged...and Seated, 10,000 Maniacs' MTV Unplugged, Paul McCartney's  Unplugged (The Official Bootleg), and Annie Lennox's  Cold. Colder. Coldest.

Reception
On its release, the blues and rock compilation received mixed reviews, with some calling it slapdash, "short on innovation", with "mediocre, uninspired efforts". Some criticism focused on the song selection and the quality of the recordings. However, reaction to the album, and the performances may be a reflection of negative views held towards MTV itself more than the artists. In keeping with MTVs perceived preference of showcasing male artists, only three of the sixteen performers were  female.

According to Spin's James Hunter, Annie Lennox, "sings 'Why,' the best thing she has ever done," Elton John and Paul Simon give "completely realized" performances and Rod Stewart "sings the shit" out of "Gasoline Alley" (the title track of his eponymous 1972 album, co-written with Ronnie Wood). Neil Young rescores "Like a Hurricane" using harmonica and pump organ. On McCartney's "We Can Work It Out", a performance mistake is left in the recording; Hunter characterizes McCartney as being "tickled by the wonderful informality of it all."

Track listing

Charts and certifications

Weekly charts

Certifications

References

External links

Warner Records compilation albums
1994 compilation albums
MTV series albums